Our Lady of Assumption College is a private and non sectarian school south of Metro Manila established in 1989. Our Lady of Assumption College is recognized by the Department of Education and the Commission on Higher Education.

History

The institution which was previously known as Our Lady of Assumption School was planned during 1988, and had its first year of operation in 1989. It has a stated mission of bringing a Christian education to the young men and women of the Southern Tagalog region.

During the first year of its operations, the first batch of classes housed at the San Pedro, Laguna campus was composed of 377 students in the Pre-Elementary and first-year high school levels.

In 1994, its founders established a branch in Santa Rosa, Laguna, offering a complete program from Pre-Elementary to High School.

In the succeeding years, campuses in Cabuyao were established in 2000 and 2004. One of the big leaps of the institution was the change of its status from Our Lady of Assumption School into the Our Lady of Assumption College of Laguna Inc.

In 2009, the fifth campus opened in Batangas. It is located in the heart of the city.

The school year 2016–2017, the school started its operation on the new educational system.

Academic Program

Senior High School
Academic Tracks
Science, Technology, Engineering & Mathematics (STEM)
Humanities and Social Science (HUMSS)
Accountancy, Business, and Management (ABM)
Technical-Vocational-Livelihood Tracks
Home Economics
Commercial Cooking, Housekeeping, and Tourism Promotion Services
Information and Communication Technology (ICT)
Computer Hardware Servicing

Undergraduate Courses
BS in Business Administration
 Major in Management
 Major in Marketing Management
BS in Computer Science
BS in Elementary Education
BS in Secondary Education
 Major in Mathematics
 Major in Biological Science
 Major in Filipino
 Major in English
BS in Hospitality Management
 Major in Hotel and Restaurant Management
 Major in Tourism
BS in Customs Administration
AB Political Science
BS Office Management
BS Real Estate Management

Vocational Courses (2 Years)
Associate in Computer Science
Associate in Hospitality Management
Hotel and Restaurant Management
Tourism

Modular Courses (1 Year)

Certificate in Hotel and Restaurant Operations
Certificate in Computer Studies

Athletics Program
The school's athletic teams are named "The Blue Knights". The OLAC Blue Knights are one of the well-decorated athletic programs in their respective cities, having won medals and championships across the country since 1989. The OLACian varsity program includes the following:
 Badminton  
 Soccer
 Indoor Soccer
 Volleyball
 Basketball
 Table Tennis
 Swimming
 Track & Field
 Chess
 Taekwondo

See also
 San Pedro, Laguna
 Santa Rosa, Laguna
 Mamatid, Cabuyao
 Cabuyao, Laguna
 Tanauan, Batangas

References
 OLAC Student's Handbook
 Our Lady of Assumption College, Santa Rosa
 www.ourladyofassumptioncollege.com

External links

High schools in Laguna (province)
Private schools in the Philippines
Universities and colleges in Laguna (province)
Universities and colleges in Batangas
Education in San Pedro, Laguna
Education in Cabuyao
Education in Santa Rosa, Laguna
Education in Tanauan, Batangas